Farshad Mobasher Fard is an Iranian citizen who was expelled from France for alleged link to Iran's nuclear program.

Mr. Mobasher was a master student of logistics and industrial management at Ecoles des Mines institute in Paris. Police expelled the 28-year-old masters student from France on 20 June 2007.

Farshad Mobasher Fard was detained when he appeared at a police station to reapply for his residence permit, and was expelled two days after.

Mr Mobasher-Fard's lawyer said the student had worked in Iran for a company which apparently had the same name as a firm connected to Iran's nuclear industry. The student was quoted by Le Parisien daily as saying he had already explained the apparent mix up to the authorities prior to his arrival to study in France.

References

See also
Sanctions against Iranian scientists
Irano-French relations

Iranian engineers
Iranian expatriates in France
Living people
Year of birth missing (living people)